Cissus verticillata, the princess vine or seasonvine, is an evergreen perennial vine in the grapevine family Vitaceae.

Taxonomy
A large number of names have been synonymized to this species; currently 72 synonyms are recognized.

Folk medicine 

Historical folk medicine recommendations include "weakness of the stomach", fevers and antiepileptic action. The root bark was also chewed "to strengthen teeth".

History and naming 

Cissus verticillata (= C. sicyoides) was discovered in 1571 in Mexico (probably in what is today the state of Michoacán) and first described in 1574 by Nicolás Monardes who named in Spanish Carlo Sancto. In Europe the plant was compared to hop (Humulus lupulus L.) so it was named by Caspar Bauhin Lupulus Mechiocanus (which means "hop of Michoacán"). The roots of Cissus verticillata were exported to Europe as a medicinal stock. The last certain reports that this medicinal stock was present in European market originate from the decline of the 18th century

References

verticillata
Vines
Flora of Florida
Flora of Mexico
Flora of South America
Medicinal plants